The 2019–20 Nashville Predators season was the 22nd season for the National Hockey League franchise that was established on June 25, 1997. They entered the season as the two-time defending Central Division champions.

The season was suspended by the league officials on March 12, 2020, after several other professional and collegiate sports organizations followed suit as a result of the ongoing COVID-19 pandemic. On May 26, the NHL regular season was officially declared over with the remaining games being cancelled. The Predators advanced to the playoffs, but were defeated in four games by the Arizona Coyotes in the qualifying round.

Standings

Divisional standings

Western Conference

Tiebreaking procedures
 Fewer number of games played (only used during regular season).
 Greater number of regulation wins (denoted by RW).
 Greater number of wins in regulation and overtime (excluding shootout wins; denoted by ROW).
 Greater number of total wins (including shootouts).
 Greater number of points earned in head-to-head play; if teams played an uneven number of head-to-head games, the result of the first game on the home ice of the team with the extra home game is discarded.
 Greater goal differential (difference between goals for and goals against).
 Greater number of goals scored (denoted by GF).

Schedule and results

Preseason
The preseason schedule was published on June 12, 2019.

Regular season
The regular season schedule was published on June 25, 2019.

Playoffs 

The Predators lost to the Arizona Coyotes in four games in the qualifying round.

Player statistics

Skaters

Goaltenders

†Denotes player spent time with another team before joining the Predators. Stats reflect time with the Predators only.
‡Denotes player was traded mid-season. Stats reflect time with the Predators only.
Bold/italics denotes franchise record.

Draft picks

Below are the Nashville Predators' selections at the 2019 NHL Entry Draft, which will be held on June 21 and 22, 2019, at Rogers Arena in Vancouver, British Columbia.

Notes:
 The Arizona Coyotes' second-round pick went to the Nashville Predators as the result of a trade on June 22, 2019, that sent New Jersey's second-round pick in 2019 (34th overall) to Philadelphia in exchange for New Jersey's third-round pick in 2019 (65th overall) and this pick.
 The Colorado Avalanche's fourth-round pick went to the Nashville Predators as the result of a trade on July 1, 2017, that sent Colin Wilson to Colorado in exchange for this pick.

References

Nashville Predators seasons
Nashville Predators
Nashville Predators
Nashville Predators